Alagappa University Evening College, Rameswaram, is a general evening degree college located in Rameswaram, Tamil Nadu. This is the only college present in the Rameswaram town.  The college is affiliated with Alagappa University. This college offers different courses in arts, commerce and science.

References

Colleges affiliated to Alagappa University